A municipal council is the legislative body of a municipality or local government area. Depending on the location and classification of the municipality it may be known as a city council, town council, town board, community council, rural council, village council, or board of aldermen.

Australia 

Because of the differences in legislation between the states, the exact definition of a city council varies. However, it is generally only those local government areas which have been specifically granted city status (usually on a basis of population) that are entitled to refer to themselves as cities. The official title is "Corporation of the City of __" or similar.

Some of the urban areas of Australia are governed mostly by a single entity (see Brisbane and other Queensland cities), while others may be controlled by a multitude of much smaller city councils. Also, some significant urban areas can be under the jurisdiction of otherwise rural local governments. Periodic re-alignments of boundaries attempt to rationalize these situations and adjust the deployment of assets and resources.

Belize 

There are currently seven town councils in Belize. Each town council consists of a mayor and a number of councillors, who are directly elected in municipal elections every three years. Town councils in Belize are responsible for a range of functions, including street maintenance and lighting, drainage, refuse collection, public cemeteries, infrastructure, parks and playgrounds.

Canada

Ontario 
Township councils in Ontario play a similar role as city councils in cities for smaller or low tier municipalities. Directly elected every four years, the number of councillors vary depending on the size of their municipalities. The councillors' powers and responsibilities are governed by the Municipal Act, 2001.

Manitoba 
Manitoba town council members serve primarily as a policy and direction board for the community. They consist of five to seven members with the head of council being the mayor or reeve.

China 
Municipal councils exist in the People's Republic of China, these are designated as Municipal People's Congress in many sub-provincial cities and direct-administered municipalities such as the Shanghai Municipal People's Congress.

France 

In spite of enormous differences in populations, each of the communes of the French Republic possesses a mayor and a municipal council, which manage the commune from the mairie (city hall), with exactly the same powers no matter the size of the commune and council. The one exception is the city of Paris, where the city police is in the hands of the central state, not in the hands of the mayor of Paris. This uniformity of status is a clear legacy of the French Revolution, which wanted to do away with the local idiosyncrasies and tremendous differences of status that existed in the kingdom of France.

The size of a commune still matters, however, in two domains: French law determines the size of the municipal council according to the population of the commune; and the size of the population determines which voting process is used for the election of the municipal council

Hong Kong 

Established as the Sanitary Board in 1883, the Municipal Council in Hong Kong Island and Kowloon (including the New Kowloon) provided municipal services to the covered regions in the then British Hong Kong. Partial elections were allowed in 1887, though merely enabling selected persons to vote for members of the Board. The Board was reconstituted in 1935 and hence renamed as Urban Council in the following year after the government had passed the Urban Council Ordinance. Democratisation had been implemented, allowing universal suffrage to happen throughout its development. Two years after the Transfer of sovereignty over Hong Kong, the Council was disbanded in 1999 by the then Chief Executive of Hong Kong Special Administrative Region. All members of the council were elected through universal suffrage by the time of the dissolution.

The counterpart of the Municipal Council serving the New Territories (excluding New Kowloon) was the Regional Council established as the Provisional Regional Council in 1986. The functional select committees, district committees, and sub-committees constituted the entire Regional Council. All members were elected from the constituencies and district boards.

Both of the Municipal Councils in Hong Kong are now defunct.

India

 See Nagar Palika for municipalities of India

Japan
Municipal councils are parliamentary bodies established in local authorities in accordance with Article 93 of the Constitution of Japan and Article 89 of the Local Autonomy Act, etc. The Yokohama and Osaka City Councils are examples.

Jordan

Malaysia

Moldova

The Municipal Council in Moldova is the governing body in five municipalities: Chișinău, Bălți, Tiraspol and Bendery (also known as Tighina or Bender). The Municipal Council (Moldovan language: Consiliul municipal) serves as a consultative body with some powers of general policy determination. It is composed of a legally determined number of counsellors (for example 35 in Bălți) elected every four years, representing political parties and independent counsellors. Once elected, counsellors may form fractions inside of the Municipal Council.

Last regional elections of local public administration held in Bălți in June 2007, brought to the power the Party of Communists of the Republic of Moldova (PCRM), which holds 21 mandates, 11 mandates are held by representatives of other parties, and 3 mandates by independents. There are two fractions in the Municipal Council: PCRM fraction (21 counsellors) and "Meleag" fraction (3 independent counsellors and 4 representatives of different parties).

The Mayor of the municipality is elected for four years. In Bălți, Vasile Panciuc (PCRM) is the incumbent from 2001 and was re-elected twice: in 2003 during the anticipated elections (as a result of a new reform of the administrative division in Moldova in 2003), and in 2007. In Chișinău, the last mayor elections had to be repeated three times, because of the low rate of participation. As a result, Dorin Chirtoacă (Liberal Party), won the last mayor elections in Chișinău.

Netherlands 

In the Netherlands the municipal council (Dutch: gemeenteraad) is the elected assembly of the municipality. It consists of between 9 and 45 members (as determined by law) who are elected by the citizens once every four years.

The council's main tasks are setting the city's policies and overseeing the execution of those policies by the municipality's executive board.

New Zealand 

Local councils in New Zealand do vary in structure, but are overseen by the government department Local Government New Zealand. For many decades until the local government reforms of 1989, a borough with more than 20,000 people could be proclaimed a city. The boundaries of councils tended to follow the edge of the built-up area, so little distinction was made between the urban area and the local government area.

New Zealand's local government structural arrangements were significantly reformed by the Local Government Commission in 1989 when approximately 700 councils and special purpose bodies were amalgamated to create 87 new local authorities.

As a result, the term "city" began to take on two meanings.

The word "city" came to be used in a less formal sense to describe major urban areas independent of local body boundaries. This informal usage is jealously guarded. Gisborne, for example, adamantly described itself as the first city in the world to see the new millennium. Gisborne is administered by a district council, but its status as a city is not generally disputed.

Under the current law the minimum population for a new city is 50,000.

Norway 
The municipal council, literally municipal board, is the highest governing body of the municipality in Norway. The municipal council sets the scope of municipal activity, takes major decisions, and delegates responsibility. The council is led by a mayor (ordfører) and is divided into an executive council (formannskap) and a number of committees, each responsible for a subsection of tasks. It is not uncommon for some members of the council to sit in the county councils too, but very rare that they also hold legislative (Storting) or Government office, without leave of absence.

The municipal council dates back to 1837 with the creation of the Formannskabsdistrikt. In cities the council is often called a city council (bystyre).

Palestine 

The Palestinian National Authority established village councils to serve as local administrations and service providers for Palestinian villages and small towns. Village councils are also referred to as D-level municipalities.

Philippines 

In the Philippines, all municipalities have their own municipal council, and these are officially called: "Sangguniang Bayan". Cities have a similar but separate form of legislature called "Sangguniang Panlungsod" (literally "city council"). The Local Government Code of 1991 established the current local government structure, including municipal councils. City councils range from 12, in most cities, to 38 members, such as the Manila City Council. Members of city councils are called "councilors".

Republic of Ireland 

The Local Government Act 2001 restyled the five county boroughs of Dublin, Cork, Galway, Waterford, and Limerick as cities, each with a city council, having the same status in law as county councils.

The Local Government Reform Act 2014 amalgamated Limerick City Council and Limerick County Council to form Limerick City and County Council, and Waterford City Council and Waterford County Council to form Waterford City and County Council.

Singapore 

In Singapore, town councils are in charge of maintaining the common areas of Housing and Development Board (HDB) flats and estates, such as the common corridors, void decks, lifts, water tanks, external lighting and the open spaces surrounding the estates.

The rationale was to delegate the duties of estate management to the members of parliament in addition to their existing responsibilities. They would also gain management experience and be accountable to their district's resident voters.

Town councils boundaries are drawn based on electoral districts boundaries. A town council area can consist of a Group Representation Constituency (GRC), a Single Member Constituency (SMC), or a collection of neighbouring GRCs and SMCs controlled by the same political party. The Members of Parliament head the town councils of their constituencies. Town councils boundaries do not correspond to new town boundaries; different parts of the same HDB town may be managed by different town councils.

Taiwan

In the Republic of China, a municipal council represents a special municipality or a provincial city. Members of the councils are elected through municipal elections held every 4–5 years.

Councils for the special municipalities in Taiwan are Taipei City Council, New Taipei City Council, Taichung City Council, Tainan City Council, Kaohsiung City Council and Taoyuan City Council.

Councils for the provincial cities in Taiwan are Chiayi City Council, Hsinchu City Council, and Keelung City Council.

Ukraine 

In Ukraine, in the city of Chernihiv, we have the Chernihiv City Council.

United Kingdom 

In the United Kingdom, not all cities have city councils, and the status and functions of city councils vary.

In England, since the Local Government Act 1972, "town council" is the specific name given to a civil parish council which has declared itself by resolution to be a town council. If another type of local council, such as a district authority, covers a single town (such as Luton or Stevenage) then the council is often a 'borough council': borough status is however conferred at the discretion of the Crown. There is also the London assembly which is City council by default

Civil parishes are the most local level in the local government system. The higher levels are district, unitary and county. However town councils are not subordinate in democratic accountability to those higher levels, but to the electorate of their civil parish area.

The chairman of a town council is entitled to be styled as "town mayor". This term contrasts with simply "mayor", which means the mayor of a borough or a city. However, this is often abbreviated simply to mayor, especially where the town was historically a borough or city, such as Lewes or Ely. In Scotland, the term 'provost' is commonly used to designate the leader of the town council.

Historically the term 'town council' was used for the governing body of a municipal borough until the 1972 Act.

England 
A city council may be:

 The council of a metropolitan district that has been granted city status.
 The council of a non-metropolitan district that has been granted city status. Some of these councils are unitary authorities and some share functions with county councils.
 A parish council that has been granted city status. These councils have limited functions. The city of Durham has a parish council, but it is known as the City of Durham Parish Council, not the city council.
 The council of a London borough that has been granted city status (of which there is only one example: Westminster City Council), or the City of London Corporation.

Northern Ireland 
Belfast City Council is now the only city council. Since the local government reforms of 2015 the other four cities form parts of wider districts and do not have their own councils.

Scotland 
A city council is the council of one of four council areas designated a City by the Local Government etc. (Scotland) Act 1994.

The three cities which are not council areas have no city council.

Wales 
In Wales, where the lowest tier of local government is known as a community, the Community Council may unilaterally declare itself to be a Town Council, but this has the same status as a Community Council.

A city council may be:

 One of the three councils of principal areas that have been granted city status.
 One of the three community councils, with limited functions, that have been granted city status.

United States 

City councils and town boards generally consist of several (usually somewhere between 5 and 51) elected aldermen or councillors. In the United States, members of city councils are typically called council member, council man, council woman, councilman, or councilwoman, while in Canada they are typically called councillor.

In some cities, the mayor is a voting member of the council who serves as chairman; in others, the mayor is the city's independent chief executive (or strong mayor) with veto power over city council legislation. In larger cities the council may elect other executive positions as well, such as a council president and speaker.

The council generally functions as a parliamentary or presidential  style legislative body, proposing bills, holding votes, and passing laws to help govern the city.

The role of the mayor in the council varies depending on whether or not the city uses council–manager government or mayor–council government, and by the nature of the statutory authority given to it by state law, city charter, or municipal ordinance.

There is also a mayor pro tem councilmember. In cities where the council elects the mayor for one year at a time, the mayor pro tem is in line to become the mayor in the next year. In cities where the mayor is elected by the city's voters, the mayor pro tem serves as acting mayor in the absence of the mayor. This position is also known as vice mayor.

In some cities a different name for the municipal legislature is used. In Portland, Oregon, for example, it is known as the City Commission. In San Francisco, it is known as the Board of Supervisors; San Francisco is a consolidated city-county and the California constitution requires each county to have a Board of Supervisors.

Ohio constitution allows local home rule to define any type of government via a Charter Commission including a type with no Mayor (city manager) or potentially citizen's could vote to institute a pure democracy with no council .

Indiana 
Indiana town council members serve as both the executive and legislative branches for small communities incorporated as towns within the state. They consist of three or five members, depending upon the town's population.

Unlike some states, Indiana councilmembers must declare a political party affiliation, if any, when they file to run for office. Upon election in November, they are sworn in before 1 January of the following year, where they serve a four-year term. There are no state term limits affecting how many times a candidate may run for re-election to office.

The first meeting after an election, members of the town council hold an organising meeting, where they elect a president to set future agendas and act as an official spokesman for the town or as liaison between the town and state and county government.

Indiana town councils work in conjunction with an elected town clerk, who manages the day-to-day business of the municipal government. As an elected official, the town clerk is solely executive in function and operates independently of the town council. But the council has final say on budgets which clerks depend upon to operate.

In addition to a clerk, the council can authorise the hiring of other staff to run the operations of government, including law enforcement officers, utility workers, park and recreation employees and town managers. These employees serve at the pleasure of the council.

Massachusetts 
Town councils in Massachusetts are essentially city councils in towns which have adopted a city form of government but prefer to retain the "town of" in their names. In several communities which have adopted such a government, the official name of the community is "The City known as the Town of..." The legislative body of a legal town in Massachusetts is a town meeting; the executive board is a board of selectmen. In addition to having the structure of a city with a mayor and council, cities in Massachusetts can enact ordinances, while towns may adopt by-laws, which are subject to the approval of the Attorney General. City ordinances are presumed to be legal unless challenged and set aside in court. See Massachusetts Government.

Michigan 
In Michigan, there are 257 incorporated villages that are governed by village councils, which is a form of weak–mayor administration.  Michigan does not use "town" as a defined municipality, and villages are the lowest-level form of incorporated municipality.  Villages are distinct from cities in that they share certain duties with their surrounding township and are not completely autonomous.  Guidelines for village governments are defined in the General Law Village Act (Act 3) of 1895.  Village councils consist of elected officials, including a village president, trustees, clerk, and treasurer.

New Hampshire 
In New Hampshire, the Town Council is an elected body which serves as the legislative and executive body of the town. The town is governed by a charter, which is allowed under the home rule provision of the New Hampshire Constitution (Pt I, Art. 39) and Title III of the New Hampshire Revised Statutes Annotated. The charter for a Town Council must meet the following requirements of RSA 49-D:3 I. (a) – (e) and all other applicable laws. The basic notion of home rule in New Hampshire is that local communities are not allowed to supersede the authority specifically granted to them by the state.

Official Ballot Town Council 
The Official Ballot Town Council is a variant form of the Town Council. In the Official Ballot form of government, the town council is vested with the limited authority to vote on all matters not voted on by official ballot. The authority and restrictions on the Official Ballot town council is the same as the Town Council, except with respect to those matters specified to be voted on by official ballot. Also, the council decides what is placed on the ballot, not the registered voters.

The charter of the Official Ballot Town Council is required by law to specify specifically:

 Which budgetary items to be included on the official ballot; and
 A finalisation process for the annual budget; and
 Process for public hearings, debate, discussion and amendment of questions to be placed on the official ballot; and
 Procedures for the transfer of funds among various departments, funds, accounts and agencies as may be necessary during the year; and
 Applicability of the official ballot procedure to special elections

Ohio 
In Ohio, the default form of municipal government organization provides limitations on the legislative body of a statutory form of government. The Ohio Revised Code does not allow the local legislative authority (council) the power to review contracts nor perform administrative duties. No review of Contracts limiting the checks & balances in a statutory form of government. A charter form of government could provide the legislative body more administrative powers, change number of seats, or change required qualifications. 
The Ohio Constitution provides for local self-government powers via a charter as defined in Section 7 of Article XVIII reads as follows: 

Sections 8 and 9 of Article XVIII provide the procedures for adoption and amendment of a municipal charter. 
The initial form of Municipal Government in Ohio is called Statuary because it is based on the default form outlined in the Ohio Revised Code statute Title 7 . 
Ohio Revised code allows for a system with no Mayor and strong council, known as Section 705.51 | City manager plan.

City of Kent, Ohio Mayor Title Only for Ceremonial Purposes 
The City of Kent, Ohio has a charter form of Government which:

Bicameralism 
Bicameral city councils were common in the United States until the 20th century, when many were abolished for cost cutting purposes and replaced with unicameral legislatures. Typically, bicameral city councils were divided into Common Councils and Boards of Aldermen, to reflect the structure of federal and state legislatures. The city of Everett, Massachusetts was the last to abolish its own bicameral city council (a seven-member Board of Aldermen and an 18-member Common Council) and replace it with an 11-member City Council, doing so with a November 8, 2011 referendum which took effect in 2014.

Examples include:

 Philadelphia City Council was bicameral from 1789 to 1919, when it included a 149-member Common Council and 41-member Select Council, making it the largest municipal legislature in the United States.
 Worcester City Council - 11-member Board of Aldermen; 30-member Common Council (1848–1948)
 Seattle City Council - nine-member Board of Aldermen; 16-member House of Delegates (1890–1896)
 New York City Council - a quasi-bicameral arrangement of the New York City Board of Estimate and the City Council until the board's abolition in 1989
 Board of Aldermen of the City of St. Louis - (1877–1915)

Others 

 Community council, the lowest tier of local government in England, Scotland and Wales
 Rural Council, a former name for Sangguniang Barangay, Philippines
 Rural Community Council, Great Britain
 Selsoviet, lowest level of administrative division in rural areas in the Soviet Union, preserved as a third tier of administrative-territorial division throughout Ukraine, Belarus and some parts of Russia
 Village council (Palestinian Authority)
 Rural Council (Ukraine)
 Rural Municipality or Gaunpalika (Nepal)

See also
 County council
Municipal elections
Municipal corporation
Petitions and E-petitions (can be submitted to city councils)
Trustee (City Government-Village Board of Trustees)

References 

 Municipal council
Municipalities